Xom or XOM  may refer to:
 ExxonMobil (NYSE: XOM)
 Komo language (ISO 639: xom), a Nilo-Saharan spoken in Ethiopia, Sudan, and Southern Sudan
 Sovereign Military Order of Malta
 XML Object Model
 Xom, a fictional deity in the game Linley's Dungeon Crawl